Praezygaena caschmirensis is a species of moth in the family Zygaenidae. It is found from Afghanistan to Nepal.

References

Moths described in 1844
Zygaeninae